Statistics of Lebanese Premier League for the 2001–02 season.

Overview
Al-Nejmeh won the championship.

League standings

References
RSSSF

Lebanese Premier League seasons
Leb
2001–02 in Lebanese football
2001–02 Lebanese Premier League